Yécora may refer to:
Yécora, Sonora
Yécora/Iekora, in the  Basque Country